

Life

Eitbar Hussain Bartar was born in Khairabad in April 1889. He was a Tehsildar of lashkar (Gwalior). He was also a great a philosopher, a poet, a religious scholar of Khairabad in India. After the retirement of majestate he writes many poets and nazms. He was a son of great Indian Urdu Poet Muztar Khairabadi, and his brothers is Jan Nisar Akhtar and Yadgar Hussain Nashtar. Nephews are Javed Akhtar poet, lyricist and script writer in Bollywood, Salman Akhtar.

His sons are :-
 Namdar Hussain (Khanjar Khairabadi)
 Barkarar hussain (Sagar)
 Shandar Hussain (Arshi)
	 
 		 
His grandsons are Farhan Akhtar, Mohammad Taheer Ahmad, Syed Urooj Ahmad, Syed Razdar Hussain (Dilbar), Kabir Akhtar, Syed Suroor Ahmad, Syed Shaoor Ahmad, Syed Touseef Ahmad, Syed Zubair Ahmad, Musheer Ahmed and Dabeer Ahmad.

New Generation of Eitbar Hussain Bartar

His great-grand sons (New Generation) are Syed Vaqar Ahmad, Syed Masroor Ahmad Bilal Ahmad, Tawqeer Ahmed, Naved Ahmed, Owais Ahmed, Saood Ahmad, Mohammad Maaz Rizvi and Muawwaz Ahmad Rizvi.

References

 Books of Muztar Khairabadi.
 His own letter's and his father Muztar Khairabadi.
 http://www.urdushayari.in/2011/11/muztar-khairabadi.html
 Javed Akhtar
 http://urduadab4u.blogspot.in/2012/02/muztar-khairabadi-renowned-urdu-poet.html

20th-century Indian philosophers
1889 births
1974 deaths